Bakewell is a civil parish in the Derbyshire Dales district of Derbyshire, England.  The parish contains over 180 listed buildings that are recorded in the National Heritage List for England.  Of these, six are listed at Grade I, the highest of the three grades, three are at Grade II*, the middle grade, and the others are at Grade II, the lowest grade.  The parish contains the market town of Bakewell and the surrounding area.  Most of the listed buildings are houses, cottages and associated structures, shops, offices, banks, and civic buildings.  The other listed buildings include churches, two medieval cross bases in a churchyard, bridges, former almshouses, a guide stone, a milestone, former corn mills, public houses, a stile, a sheepwash enclosure, a former workhouse, now a hospital, with associated buildings, a railway station, a drinking fountain, a war memorial, and two telephone kiosks.


Key

Buildings

References

Citations

Sources

 

Lists of listed buildings in Derbyshire
l